Robert John Bruniges (3 August 1956 – 6 February 2023) was a British fencer and three weapon qualified coach. He became world junior foil champion in 1976 and competed at the 1976, 1980 and 1984 Summer Olympics. In 1981, he won the foil title at the British Fencing Championships.

Bruniges was educated at Millfield School. He died in February 2023, at the age of 66.

References

1956 births
2023 deaths
British male fencers
Olympic fencers of Great Britain
Fencers at the 1976 Summer Olympics
Fencers at the 1980 Summer Olympics
Fencers at the 1984 Summer Olympics
Sportspeople from London
20th-century British people
People educated at Millfield